The 1380s BC refers to the period between 1389 BC and 1380 BC, the 1380s was the second decade of the 14th century BC.

Events and Trends

 Decline of the Minoan Culture in Crete.
 Pharaoh Amenhotep III of Egypt marries Tiye, his Chief Queen.
 Amenhotep III attempts to connect the Nile and the Red Sea with a canal, this however would not be done successfully until almost 1000 years later with the opening of the Canal of the Pharaohs.

Significant people
 Amenhotep III - Pharaoh of Egypt.

References